The WTA Singapore Open is a defunct WTA Tour affiliated women's tennis tournament played from 1986 to 1994. It was held at the Kallang Tennis Centre in Singapore. The tournament was held on indoor hard courts in 1986 and on outdoor hard courts from 1987 to 1994. It was part of the WTA Tier IV category in 1990 and 1994.

Results

Singles

Doubles

See also
 Singapore Open – men's tournament

References
 WTA Results Archive

 
Hard court tennis tournaments
Indoor tennis tournaments
Tennis tournaments in Singapore
Singapore
Defunct tennis tournaments in Asia
Defunct sports competitions in Singapore